Labelle is a village and municipality in the Laurentides region of Quebec, Canada, part of the Les Laurentides Regional County Municipality. Its large "L"-shaped territory surrounds Lake Labelle, and the village is located along the Rouge River and Route 117.

Demographics
Population trend:
 Population in 2021: 2765 (2016 to 2021 population change: 11.6%)
 Population in 2016: 2477 
 Population in 2011: 2445 
 Population in 2006: 2258
 Population in 2001: 2272
 Population in 1996: 2256 (or 2271 when adjusted for 2001 boundaries)
 Population in 1991: 2090

Private dwellings occupied by usual residents: 1362 (total dwellings: 2017)

Mother tongue:
 English as first language: 2.6%
 French as first language: 94.6%
 English and French as first language: 0.9%
 Other as first language: 1.5%

Education

Sainte Agathe Academy (of the Sir Wilfrid Laurier School Board) in Sainte-Agathe-des-Monts serves English-speaking students in this community for both elementary and secondary levels.

References

External links
 

Incorporated places in Laurentides
Municipalities in Quebec